Grand Council of Treaty 3 (GCT3) is a political organization representing 24 First Nation communities across Treaty 3 areas of northern Ontario and southeastern Manitoba, Canada, and four additional First Nations, specifically in regard to their Treaty rights.

Mandate
The GCT3 operates under the mandate in which their direction of the leadership and benefit/protection of the Citizens are carried out by the administrative office of GCT3 to protect, preserve and enhance Treaty and Aboriginal rights.  These points are upheld by GCT3 by advancing the exercise of inherent jurisdiction, sovereignty, nation-building, and traditional governance with the aim to preserve and build the Anishinaabe Nation’s goal of self-determination.

Departments 
 Administrative Office
 Bimiiwinitisowin Omaa Akiing (Governance on Our Land)
 Child Care
 Culture and Citizenship
 Economic Development
 Education
 Health
 Housing / Infrastructure
 Internal / External Relations
 Justice
 Natural Resources
 Social Services
 Treaty and Aboriginal Rights Research
 Trapping
 Youth and Recreation

Affiliated First Nations 
Anishinabeg of Kabapikotawangag Resource Council
Animakee Wa Zhing 37
Big Grassy
Naongashiing (Big Island)
Northwest Angle 33
Onigaming
Wauzhushk Onigum
Bimose Tribal Council
Asubpeeschoseewagong (Grassy Narrows)
Eagle Lake
Iskatewizaagegan 39
Lac des Mille Lacs
Naotkamegwanning (Whitefish Bay)
Obashkaandagaang Bay
Niisaachewan Anishinaabe Nation
Shoal Lake 40
Wabaseemoong (Whitedog)
Wabauskang
Wabigoon Lake
Pwi-Di-Goo-Zing Ne-Yaa-Zhing Advisory Services
Couchiching
Lac La Croix
Naicatchewenin
Nigigoonsiminikaaning
Rainy River
Seine River
Stanjikoming

Non-affiliated First Nations 
Though signatories to Treaty 3, the following First Nations are not members of the Grand Council of Treaty 3.  However, as the Grand Council is the treaty administrant, the Grand Council works closely with these non-affiliated First Nations:
 Buffalo Point
 Lac Seul
 Sagkeeng (Fort Alexander) Sagkeeng First Nation is a non-signatory to Treaty 3. Sagkeeng First Nation is a signatory to Treaty 1. 
 Saugeen

See also
Treaty Three Police Service

References

External links
Official website

Ojibwe in Canada
Anishinaabe tribal political organizations
Anishinaabe tribal treaty administrants
First Nations tribal councils in Ontario